This article is a list of all Gothenburg tram network stations, which serve Gothenburg  in southwest Sweden.

References

Tram
Tram transport in Sweden